Adrien Dipanda (born 3 May 1988) is a French handball player for Saint-Raphaël and the French national team.

He participated in the 2016 European Men's Handball Championship and 2016 Olympics.

References

External links

1988 births
Living people
French sportspeople of Cameroonian descent
Sportspeople from Dijon
French male handball players
Olympic handball players of France
Handball players at the 2016 Summer Olympics
Medalists at the 2016 Summer Olympics
Olympic silver medalists for France
Olympic medalists in handball
Expatriate handball players
Montpellier Handball players
French expatriate sportspeople in Spain
CB Ademar León players
Liga ASOBAL players
Competitors at the 2009 Mediterranean Games
Mediterranean Games silver medalists for France
Mediterranean Games medalists in handball